William Henry Harrison Seeley, VC (1 May 1840 – 1 October 1914) was an American who fought with the British Royal Navy during the Shimonoseki Campaign in Japan and was a recipient of the Victoria Cross (VC), the highest award for gallantry in the face of the enemy that can be awarded to British and Commonwealth forces. He was the first American-born recipient of the VC.

Details
He was 24 years old, and an ordinary seaman in the Royal Navy during the Shimonoseki Campaign in Japan when, on 6 September 1864 at Shimonoseki, during the capture of the enemy's stockade, Ordinary Seaman Seeley of  distinguished himself by carrying out a daring reconnaissance to ascertain the enemy's position, and then, although wounded, continuing to take part in the final assault on the battery. He was presented his medal at Southsea on 22 September 1865 together with Thomas Pride and Duncan Gordon Boyes who also won their Victoria Crosses at Shimonoseki. He was the first American citizen to win the Victoria Cross. His medal is not publicly displayed, and its location is currently unknown.

References

Royal Navy sailors
1840 births
1914 deaths
Royal Navy recipients of the Victoria Cross
People from Topsham, Maine
American recipients of the Victoria Cross
British military personnel of the Shimonoseki campaign
19th-century Royal Navy personnel
Military personnel from Dedham, Massachusetts
American expatriates in Japan